The fourth season of the Philippine television reality competition show, The Clash was broadcast by GMA Network. Hosted by Rayver Cruz, Julie Anne San Jose, Ken Chan and Rita Daniela, it premiered on October 2, 2021, on the network's Sabado Star Power and Sunday Grande line up. The season ended on December 19, 2021, having Mariane Osabel as the winner.

Online auditions
The show opens online auditions on May 3 for the season to singers aged 21 and above, following strict guidelines during the COVID-19 pandemic in the Philippines.

Top 30
The first ten clashers, from Metro Manila, of the Top 30 was announced on August 21, 2021 followed by the next group from Luzon on August 22 and the last ten singers (2 from Visayas and 8 from Mindanao) on August 23. Before the show's premiere, Iris Jule from Davao City and Mike Luna from Pangasinan withdrew from the competition due to prior commitments. They were replaced by Yvette Celoso from Lanao del Norte and Kaye Eliseo from Muntinlupa.

One of the 30 clashers will be electronically selected and will choose the opponent to battle it out in a singing duel with the winner advancing to the next round. For the fifteen temporarily eliminated clashers; five of them will be saved by the judges but in the following battles, one clasher would later be swapped out to another until the end of Round 1. Melanie Guevarra quit the show for unknown reasons during the second round until the last battle of the remaining three clashers from each group. Originally, a wild card round for the sixteenth spot was contended for the five losing clashers in each battle in Round 2 after Guevarra's departure until the judges choose two of them to complete the Top 16.

Color key

  Winner
  Runner-up
  Finalists
  Eliminated in the Fifth Round
  Eliminated in the Fourth Round
  Eliminated in the Third Round
  Eliminated in the Second Round
  Eliminated in the First Round
  Withdrew
 Italicized names are the clashers selected by the judges in The Clash Rebound.
 Underlined names are the clashers selected by the judges in the Danger Zone.

aRaffy Roque and Sky Valentine participated in The Clash Back in place of Eliseo and Uy.bVilmark Viray was reinstated in the competition after beating out Renz Fernando in The Clash Back on December 12, 2021.

Round 1: One on One
For the fourth season; the first round changed to the format of the Laban kung Laban round from season 2 and Kakulay Kalaban from  season 3, where the show divides the 30 clashers into three groups. Below is the groupings selection.

The randomizer will select the clasher to choose their opponent from their respective group to advance in the next round with the majority of the panel's votes. This season introduces The Clash Rebound where the Top 30 clashers who lost in the first round will be given an opportunity to be reinstated in the competition. The judges will select the majority of the losing contestants they wanted to advance in the second round and fill in the five seats of the blue group. However, if all five clashers are already selected, the judges could replace them if they preferred a later performer until the end of the first round.

Color key

Episode 1 (October 2)
The episode opens with performances of season 3 winner Jessica Villarubin and her single "Beautiful", SB19's "Go Up" by the hosts and judges before joining the season 4 top 30 clashers to perform the show's theme song "Mangarap Ka, Laban Pa" by Quest.

Episode hashtag: #TheClash2021

Episode 2 (October 3)

Episode hashtag: #TheClashOneOnOne

1The clasher was originally selected in The Clash Rebound.

Episode 3 (October 9)

Episode hashtag: #TheClashKakulayKalaban

Episode 4 (October 10)

Episode hashtag: #TheClashAgawanNgUpuan

Episode 5 (October 16)

Episode hashtag: #TheClashRebound

1The clasher was selected by the host.

Round 2: Laban Kung Laban
The new format for the second round is a four-way battle where four singers (one from each group) will be given one minute to decide who will perform to compete for three places in the Top 16. If none of the singers from the groups decided to volunteer, the randomizer will select the four of that night. The host will select the clasher to perform first in each episode. Below is the groupings selection. Italicized names are those electronically selected.

The five losing clashers from each episode will be sent to one of the seats at the Danger Zone where they will be competing for the sixteenth spot at the end of Round 2.

Color key

Episode 6 (October 17)
Melanie Guevarra was absent for this week before the start of the second round.

Episode hashtag: #TheClashofColors

Non-competition performance: BTS' "Dynamite" and "Butter" by Christian Bautista, Julie Anne San Jose, Garrett Bolden, Jeremiah Tiangco, Thea Astley and Sheemee Buenaobra

Episode 7 (October 23)
Two battles have been drafted in the seventh episode this week and finished with the first two performances from the second battle.

Episode hashtag: #TheClashDangerZone

Episode 8 (October 24)
The second battle in the previous episode continued on Sunday.

Episode hashtag: #TheClashLabanKungLaban

Episode 9 (October 30)
Melanie Guevarra had withdrawn from the competition earlier for personal reasons. Therefore, her fellow competitors proceeded to the last battle with only two clashers safe, leaving just fourteen contestants remaining in the Top 16.

Episode hashtag: #TheClashBakbakan

Non-competition performance: "Almusal" by Ken Chan and Rita Daniela

Episode 10 (October 31)
The five clashers in the Danger Zone from each episode originally compete for the sixteenth wildcard slot after Guevarra left the show during Round 2. Instead, two clashers will be selected by the panel to complete the Top 16 and advance to the third round.

Episode hashtag: #TheClashDangerV

Round 3: Pares Kontra Pares
In this round, the clashers were paired. Raffy Roque, who was the last to be safe in the Wildcard round from Round 2, was selected by the host to choose her partner from the opposite groups for a duet while the selected partner each take turns to compose the pairs. Below is the groupings selection.

1The clasher was selected by the host.

For each set, a pair will be chosen electronically, who will in turn choose their opponent pair. After the performance, the clash panel will vote for a pair who will advance to the next round. For the losing pair, they will compete with each other in Matira ang Matibay round and only one will remain, still subject for the votes of the clash panel. The challenged pair will either proceed ("Clash") or opt ("Pass") the opponent pair's challenge for one battle but if the pair choose the latter option, they will automatically compete against another pair selected by the randomizer in the next battle.

Color key

Episode 11 (November 6)

Episode hashtag: #TheClashParesKontraPares

Episode 12 (November 7)
After using the pass in the previous episode, Raffy Roque and Renz Fernando are challenged by default to compete against the opponent pair selected by the randomizer.

Episode hashtag: #TheClashKakampiKalaban

Non-competition performance: Ava Max's "Kings & Queens" by Ai-Ai delas Alas

Episode 13 (November 13)

Episode hashtag: #TheClashMatiraAngMatibay

Episode 14 (November 14)

Episode hashtag: #TheClashHulingApat

Round 4: 3 vs 3
The group battles in this round involves the twelve clashers performing a medley of songs in groups of three. Rare Columna, who was the last to be safe in Round 3, selected three other clashers taking turns to pick their members for their teams. Below is the groupings selection. Italicized names are those selected by Columna.

The randomizer electronically selects the first trio who will pick their opponent group by default to start the third round.

Color key

Episode 15 (November 20)

Episode hashtag: #TheClashThreeVsThree

Non-competition performance: Mariah Carey's "Oh Santa!" by Julie Anne San Jose, Rita Daniela and Jessica Villarubin

Episode 16 (November 21)

Episode hashtag: #TheClashTopTen

Round 5: Isa Laban Sa Lahat
This is the final round of the competition. Every week, after the performances, the judges will select their top clashers (number depends on every episode) who will stay on the competition while the bottom two clashers will face-off on Matira ang Matibay round where one clasher will be safe while the other will be eliminated.

Color key

Top 10
The randomizer selected a clasher who will pick a set of clashers that will perform on the episode. The first clasher will select the next clasher to perform next.

Episode 17 (November 27)
Episode hashtag: #TheClashIsaLabanSaLahat

Non-competition performance: "Jingle Bells" by Lani Misalucha

Matira ang Matibay

Episode 18 (November 28)
Episode hashtag: #TheClashSakalam

Matira ang Matibay

Top 8
The randomizer selects Mariane Osabel who will select four of the eight clashers who will perform on the episode. The remaining clashers who did not pick alongside Osabel will perform on the next episode.

Episode 19 (December 4)
Episode hashtag: #TheClashTough8

Matira ang Matibay

Episode 20 (December 5)
Episode hashtag: #TheClashOneVersusEveryone

Matira ang Matibay

Top 6
The clashers are responsible in picking the order of their performances by draw lots.

The bottom two clashers are announced and there is no Matira ang Matibay performance on this round. Instead the bottom clasher will battle the wildcard clasher on the next episode.

Episode 21 (December 11)
Episode hashtag: #TheClashTop6Showdown

The Clash Back
The eliminated clashers of the Top 12 have the chance to return to the competition by being a wildcard and the clasher who advanced competes against Fernando on the Matira ang Matibay round. Anthony Uy and Kaye Eliseo did not participate in the Clash Back. Both were replaced by Raffy Roque and Sky Valentine.

Episode 22 (December 12)
Episode hashtag: #TheClashback2021

Matira ang Matibay

Final Top 6

Episode 23 (December 18)

Clashers each performed a medley of two songs. The clash panel are responsible in picking the order of the clasher's performance by draw lots.

Episode hashtag: #TheClashFinal5

The Final Clash 2021
The Clashers perform in a pre-determined order. Only two clashers will advance to the Ultimate Final Clash to determine the grand champion of this season.

Episode 24 (December 19)
Episode hashtag: #TheFinalClash2021

Non-competition performance: Clean Bandit and Zara Larsson's "Symphony" by Jessica Villarubin

The Final One-on-One
The songs that was sung by the final two clashers are the original compositions from The Clash 2021 Songwriting Contest. Harish Joya is the composer of the winning piece "Bakit Mahal Pa Rin Kita", meanwhile Christian Paul Rosa wrote "Umuwi Ka Na". Both songs are arranged by the show's musical director, Marc Lopez.

The season closes with Mariane Osabel performing her victory song once more, after she was proclaimed as the winner.

Elimination chart
Color key

Notable contestants
Top 30
 The following Top 30 clashers have recently competed on Tawag ng Tanghalan:
 Chelle Mariveles was the regional contender in the first season and the fourth quarter of the third season.
 Yvette Celoso was the defending champion in the second season.
 Nikki Enriquez was the daily winner in the first season.
 Reign Lanz was the regional contender in the third quarter of the third season and the daily winner in the fourth season.
 Nikka Villegas recently appeared in the talent competition segment, Juan for All, All for Juan and as a guest performer on Eat Bulaga!

Top 20
 The following Top 20 clashers have recently competed on Tawag ng Tanghalan:
 Melanie Guevarra was the regional contender for the first season.
 JP Bacallan was the regional contender for Metro Manila in the fourth quarter of the third season.
 Elmerjun Hilario was originally a member of Sarah Geronimo's team on the second season of The Voice of the Philippines and was eliminated in the Knockout round on Bamboo Mañalac's team. He also competed in Tawag ng Tanghalan.

Top 16
 Jessa Jane Neri is the cousin of Krizza Neri, the winner of Protégé: The Battle for the Big Break.
 Raffy Roque competed in the singing competition segment, Music Hero: The Vocal Battle in Eat Bulaga! She also won in an episode of the first season of I Can See Your Voice where she had a chance to duet with Arci Munoz.
 Sky Valentine was a former member of Star Magic Batch 16, under the screen name, Auriette Divina. She was on the first season of The X Factor Philippines as a member of  the girl group A.K.A. Jam before becoming the first group eliminated on the third week of the live shows.
 Eric Celino was the regional contender in the first season of Tawag ng Tanghalan.

Top 12
 Anthony Uy was the lead vocalist of EastSide Band and recently competed in the second season of Tawag ng Tanghalan.

Top 10
 Rare Columna first appeared in the talent competition segment, Grabe S'ya on Eat Bulaga! and finished in the semi-finals. She later return to the show as guest appearances in game show segments Boom! and Bawal Judgmental.
 The following Top 10 clashers have recently competed on Tawag ng Tanghalan:
 Jeffrey dela Torre was the regional contender in the first season and the daily winner in the second quarter of the third season.
 Kaye Eliseo was the regional contender for Metro Manila in the third quarter of the third season.
 Fame Gomez and Julia Serad were regional contenders in the first season.
 Mariane Osabel competed in the quarter-end semifinals of the third season.
 Lovely Restituto was the daily winner in the fifth season where she beat former The Clash season 2 contestant Mark Mendoza.
 Renz Fernando appeared as one of the Top 35 acts in the fifth season of D'Academy Asia alongside The Clash season 3 finalist Sheemee Buenaobra and GMA singer Hannah Precillas before he was eliminated in the Top 12 after Buenaobra in the Top 16, while Precillas finished as the second runner-up. He also briefly competed in Tawag ng Tanghalan.
 Vilmark Viray was the daily winner of the second season of Tawag ng Tanghalan. He also won in an episode of the first season of I Can See Your Voice where he had a chance to duet with Nina Girado.

References

External links
 

2021 Philippine television seasons